is a passenger railway station located in the city of Tsuyama, Okayama Prefecture, Japan, operated by West Japan Railway Company (JR West).

Lines

Station layout
The station consists of one side platform located on an embankment, serving a single bi-directional track. The station is unattended.

History
Miura Station opened on April 1, 1963. With the privatization of the Japan National Railways (JNR) on April 1, 1987, the station came under the aegis of the West Japan Railway Company.

Passenger statistics
In fiscal 2019, the station was used by an average of 14 passengers daily..

Surrounding area
 Okayama Prefectural Road/Tottori Prefectural Road No. 6 Tsuyama Chizu Hatto Line
 Kamo River

See also
List of railway stations in Japan

References

External links

  Miura Station Official Site

Railway stations in Okayama Prefecture
Railway stations in Japan opened in 1963
Tsuyama